is a fictional character from the Tekken fighting game series released by Namco Bandai Games. Bosconovitch was introduced in Tekken 3, in which he is one of the three playable bonus characters (Gon and Tiger Jackson being the other two), and has returned in Tekken Card Challenge and Tekken Tag Tournament 2. Despite being playable in only Tekken 3, TCC and TTT2 so far, he appears in almost every game. Bosconovitch is a former Soviet scientist involved in cloning and is the one responsible for the creation of the Jack androids. He is also responsible for the creation of the android Alisa Bosconovitch, whom he created in the image of his deceased daughter.

Appearances

In video games
Dr. Bosconovitch originally worked for the Mishima Zaibatsu. During the first Tekken, the Manji ninja clan (led by Yoshimitsu) raided the Mishima Zaibatsu's vault. During the raid, Yoshimitsu lost his arm and was found by Bosconovitch who helped him escape and fitted him with a mechanical arm. Dr. Bosconovitch was kidnapped by Kazuya Mishima in the run-up to The King of Iron Fist Tournament 2 and was forced to work for him. Some of the many projects involved the creation of the bio-weapons Roger and Alex, as well as the completion of the Prototype Jack unit. He began the "Cold Sleep" project as a means of preserving his daughter's body (who seemingly died) by using Nina Williams and Anna Williams as test subjects. After completing his tasks, and before being executed, Doctor Bosconovitch is rescued by the friend he helped save previously, Yoshimitsu. Nineteen years later, he contracted a rare disease that affects the spine as a result of working on his Cold Sleep project. In order to cure himself and to revive his daughter, he needed the blood of the fighting god, Ogre. He turned to an old friend, Yoshimitsu, for help. Yoshimitsu entered the King of Iron Fist Tournament 3 and was successful in obtaining a sample of Ogre's blood after Jin Kazama had killed it. Dr. Bosconovitch appears in Bryan Fury's Tekken 4 ending. In it, he explains to Bryan that he will now mechanize him and allow him to be completely reborn in a new incarnation. Bryan lays supine on the table and Bosconovitch holds a gun-shaped device containing sleeping gas. Bidding him sweet dreams, he injects the gas into Bryan. Throughout, he speaks in a calm and gentle tone. However, the doctor found Bryan's body too complex, and he instead installed a perpetual generator. Bryan proceeded to attack the doctor, as well as Manji Clan members who were with him. While the members were slain, Bosconovitch survived, though he was severely injured. In Tekken 6, he creates an android in his daughter's image, Alisa Bosconovitch.

Dr. Bosconovitch appears in Tekken Tag Tournament'''s  mini game Tekken Bowl mode, where he can be seen in the crowd of people cheering. It is even possible to "take him out" using a bowling ball. He also appears in Tekken Hybrid where he returns again as an onlooker in the crowd of Tekken Bowl (there is also a trophy named after him called "Doctor B!"  with the description being "K.O. an onlooker in Tekken Bowl" with an icon of Bryan as the picture). He returns in Tekken Tag Tournament 2 as part of a free update. Although he does not appear in person in Death by Degrees, Nina Williams' spin-off game, he is mentioned several times in journals and documents, and he has a laboratory on the Solitaria Penitentiary island, although it's abandoned. Dr. Bosconovitch was mentioned by several Tekken characters in Capcom-made crossover fighting game Street Fighter X Tekken.

In other media
Dr. Bosconovitch appears in comics Tekken Saga (1997), Tekken 2 (1998) and Tekken Comic (2009). Dr. Bosconovitch is featured in Tekken: The Motion Picture. Lei Wulong, Jane, and Jack-2 visit him in his science lab. Jack-2 needs his help because Jane is ill. When the destruction button is hit by Lee Chaolan, Dr. Bosconovitch, Lei, Jane and Jack-2 escaped. Unfortunately, Jack-2's torso is crushed by a door. Doctor Bosconovitch and Lei promised to look after Jane for Jack-2. Though Dr. Bosconovitch doesn't appear in Tekken: Blood Vengeance, he is mentioned by Alisa who wants to search for him as part of her program.

Character design
Dr. Bosconovitch is always depicted as a short, old man with white hair and with scientist glasses. He wears white mantle, blue shirt, orange tie, green pants and brown shoes. His Player 2 Costume is the same as Yoshimitsu's Tekken 3 Player 1 Costume, with a gold and blue color scheme and without the mask.

Gameplay and fighting style
Dr. Bosconovitch's fighting style is named either Various due to this fact or "Panic Fighting". However, coming from Russia, his strikes are patterned after Systema. Many of Dr. Bosconovitch's moves are taken from other characters in the Tekken series (such as Lei, Heihachi, Yoshimitsu, Jack, Ling Xiaoyu and others). Some moves have been slightly altered to fit his frail state and habit of falling down. Because he suffers from scoliosis, a disease that affects his spine, Bosconovitch will usually fall to the ground after performing a move unless "f" is pressed after performing it. In fact, in one of Bosconovitch's pre-fight animations (which mimics Kuma/Panda's "stretching" one), he falls to the ground after performing it. In Tekken Tag Tournament 2, Doctor Bosconovitch is seen using crazy and weird tactics and inventions, such as electricity and fire, as his fighting style. Bomb detonations accompany many of his stronger moves. Unlike in Tekken 3, Bosconovitch now has the abilities to run, jump, and stand up properly. His main stances are "Mad Pain", "Panic Doctor", "The Zen" and "Electric Charge". He no longer suffers from falling after the majority of his moves, though he can immediately drop to the ground with "Trick Fall" and "Surprise Tumble" and a good deal of his moves still end with him lying flat on his back or stomach.

Reception
In 2011, Computer and Video Games placed Dr. Bosconovitch in their list Tekken 's "worst ever characters", adding: "You join in and realise that you're a geriatric who can't even move your legs and the first round sees you pitted against the gigantic metal death-bot you created." In a GamesRadar article by Michael Grimm, a fight between Dr. Bosconovitch and Dan was written as one of the ones players wanted to see in Street Fighter X Tekken, commenting "While Dan’s fighting style revolves primarily around taunting and being a goof, Dr. Boskonovitch’s fighting style is primarily composed of falling down or frantically hurling his body at the opponent. They're a perfect match." GamesRadar also placed his Dr. Bosconovitch's name as the "gaming’s most difficult-to-pronounce name". Complex placed his spending on the ground in their 2012 list of the craziest moments in the Tekken'' series, commenting: "Besides the fact that he’s one of the most hardcore Tekken characters ever, he’s also one of the clumsiest, as he spends half the match either on his back or on his face". 4thletter placed Dr. Bosconovitch's Tekken Tag Tournament 2 ending at 178th place in their list "The Top 200 Fighting Game Endings". Lazygamer ranked Dr. Bosconovitch as the "5th strangest hidden fighting game character", adding: "Dead mice have better defences than Dr Bosconovitch, a character who exists solely to appease those fans who are still pissed off that Stephen Hawking: World Warrior, isn’t a game yet." In the official poll by Namco, Dr. Boscnovitch ranked as the 21st most requested Tekken character to be playable in Tekken X Street Fighter, at 6.40% of votes.

References

Cryonically preserved characters in video games
Fictional Russian people in video games
Fictional Soviet people
Fictional inventors in video games
Male characters in video games
Fictional scientists in video games
Tekken characters
Video game characters introduced in 1997